Luis García Ortega was a Spanish actor and screenwriter. He had served in the Spanish Foreign Legion which was a major influence on his screenplay for the 1941 film ¡Harka!.

Selected filmography

Actor
 Cristina Guzmán (1943)
 The Princess of the Ursines (1947)

References

Bibliography
 Luisa Passerini, Jo Labanyi & Karen Diehl. Europe and Love in Cinema''. Intellect Books, 2012.

External links

Year of birth unknown
Year of death unknown
Spanish male film actors
Spanish male television actors
Spanish screenwriters